Mothership is the seventh studio album by American rock band Dance Gavin Dance, released on October 7, 2016, on Rise Records. The album serves as a follow-up the group's sixth studio album, Instant Gratification (2015), and is their second consecutive studio release with the same consistent line-up. The album was produced by Kris Crummett. Upon its release, the album sold over 19,000 copies within its first week in retail, debuting at No. 13 on the Billboard 200.

The album was supported by four singles; "Chucky Vs. The Giant Tortoise", "Betrayed by the Game", "Young Robot", and "Inspire the Liars". To promote the album, the band embarked on the Mothership Tour, which consisted of two North American legs and one European leg, and toured on the 2017 Vans Warped Tour. On June 28, 2019, the band released an instrumental version of the album to streaming and digital download platforms.

Recording
Mothership was recorded by the band at Interlace Audio Recording Studios in North Portland, Oregon over a two-month period between April and June 2016 with producer Kris Crummett. During the recording sessions for the album, the band sought out and collaborated with other musicians such as Andrew Michael Wells of Eidola, Aric Garcia of Hail the Sun, Martin Bianchini of Secret Band, and former Dance Gavin Dance guitarist Zachary Garren of Strawberry Girls.

Artwork
The album artwork for Mothership was created by Swedish illustrator and artist Mattias Adolfsson, who has previously created the album artwork for six of Dance Gavin Dance's studio albums. The album cover depicts a "mothership" in the upper sector of the photo in the shape of an infinity symbol whilst citizens praise its arrival on the ground below. Easter eggs are also illustrated in the album's artwork, including the Death Star-inspired space ship as seen on the band's 2008 self-titled studio album.

Promotion

Mothership was unveiled by the band on July 27, 2016, slated for an October 7, 2016 release date. On August 18, Dance Gavin Dance released the album's lead single, "Chucky vs. The Giant Tortoise", for digital download. A second single, "Betrayed by the Game", was released on September 16. On the same day, the music video for "Betrayed by the Game" premiered on the official Rise Records YouTube channel. An animated music video for the song "Young Robot" premiered on September 27, 2016. On March 3, 2017, the band released the music video for their single "Inspire the Liars".

Throughout the week prior to the release of Mothership, the band uploaded previews of songs off of the album daily on their social media.

Three years later, on June 28, 2019, Rise Records released an instrumental version of Mothership.

Tour
The band embarked on the headlining Mothership Tour in the United States and Canada from September 22 to October 27, 2016. The tour included support from The Contortionist, Hail the Sun, Good Tiger, and The White Noise. A European headlining tour took place from November 3 to November 26, 2016 with special guest appearances from former members Jonny Craig and Kurt Travis in honor of the band's tenth anniversary.

Another North American tour took place from February 24 to March 19, 2017 with special guest CHON and support from Eidola and Vasudeva. The band toured the entirety of the 2017 Vans Warped Tour from June 16 to August 6, 2017.

Track listing

Personnel
Dance Gavin Dance
 Tilian Pearson – clean vocals
 Jon Mess – unclean vocals
 Will Swan – lead guitar, rap vocals on "Chocolate Jackalope"
 Tim Feerick – bass guitar
 Matthew Mingus – drums, percussion

'Additional musicians
 Zachary Garren – guitar on "Chucky vs. The Giant Tortoise", "Inspire the Liars"
 Martin Bianchini – guitar on "Petting Zoo Justice", "Chocolate Jackalope", "Man of the Year"
 Andrew Wells – guitar on "Deception"
 Jessica Esposito – flute on "Young Robot"

Production
 Kris Crummett – producer
 Mattias Adolfsson – album artwork

Charts

References 

2016 albums
Dance Gavin Dance albums
Rise Records albums
Albums produced by Kris Crummett